11th Central Committee may refer to:
Central Committee of the 11th Congress of the Russian Communist Party (Bolsheviks), 1922–1923
11th Central Committee of the Bulgarian Communist Party, 1976–1981
11th Central Committee of the Chinese Communist Party, 1986–1989
11th Central Committee of the Romanian Communist Party, 1974–1979
11th Central Committee of the Lao People's Revolutionary Party, 2021–2026
11th Central Committee of the Communist Party of Vietnam, 2011–2016
11th Central Committee of the League of Communists of Yugoslavia, 1978–1982